Bombyx rotundapex is a moth of the family Bombycidae. It is found in Taiwan.

References

Moths described in 1990
Bombycidae